Bishop River Provincial Park is a provincial park in the Pacific Ranges of the Coast Mountains on the Mainland of British Columbia, Canada, located southwest of and adjoining Ts'yl-os Provincial Park.  It lies along the upper course of the Bishop River, the main tributary of the Southgate River, from the Bishop's source at the western side of the Lillooet Icecap to midway along its course above its confluence with the Southgate.  The park is 19,947 ha. in size.  There are no roads or trails in the park although a forest service road from Waddington Harbour at the head of Bute Inlet leads up the Southgate to within a few miles of the park boundary.

References

Provincial parks of British Columbia
Pacific Ranges
Year of establishment missing